Franziska B. Grieder is a Swiss-American veterinary scientist. She is the director of the Office of Research Infrastructure Programs at the National Institutes of Health. Grieder was a faculty member and researcher at the Uniformed Services University of the Health Sciences.

Early life and education
Born in Dayton, Ohio, Grieder grew up in Switzerland and received her doctorate in veterinary medicine from the University of Zurich. She earned her M.S. and Ph.D. in viral pathogenesis at the University of Wisconsin–Madison, and conducted postdoctoral research on the Venezuelan equine encephalitis virus (VEE) at the University of North Carolina at Chapel Hill.

Career
Beginning in 1993, Grieder joined the faculty and conducted research at the medical school of the Uniformed Services University of the Health Sciences (USU) within the Department of Microbiology and Immunology, and Molecular/Cell Biology and Neuroscience in Bethesda, Maryland. Her areas of expertise include viral-induced neuroimmunology and neurodegeneration, emerging viral threats and the molecular genetics of the VEE virus. In 2000, at the National Center for Research Resources (NCRR), Grieder began managing the Division of Comparative Medicine's Laboratory Animal Sciences Program, where she created the Mutant Mouse Regional Resource Centers Program and supervised grants related to mammalian models, comparative and functional genomics, and training opportunities for veterinarians and veterinary students. Grieder joined the National Institutes of Health (NIH) in 2000 as a program official in the Division of Comparative Medicine, which was located in the former National Center for Research Resources (NCRR). She was appointed director of the division in 2004, with responsibilities that include the management and oversight of the eight national primate research centers, primate breeding and resource-related projects, development of mammalian and non-mammalian animal model resources, pre- and post-doctoral training for veterinarians, and a variety of research projects. From July 2012 to January 2013, Grieder served as the acting director of the Office of Research Infrastructure Programs (ORIP). She became the director of ORIP on January 13, 2013. She continues to serve as an adjunct faculty in the Department of Pathology and Program of Neuroscience at USU. At USU, her research focused on viral pathogenesis using mouse models to investigate neuroimmune mechanisms.

She has written numerous articles and book chapters for scientific publications, and her research has appeared in peer-reviewed journals including Virology, Journal of Immunology and Nature Genetics.

Selected publications

References 

20th-century American biologists
21st-century American biologists
20th-century American women scientists
21st-century American women scientists
Scientists from Ohio
National Institutes of Health people
Women veterinary scientists
American veterinarians
Swiss women scientists
20th-century Swiss scientists
21st-century Swiss scientists
20th-century Swiss women
21st-century Swiss women
University of Zurich alumni
University of Wisconsin–Madison alumni
Uniformed Services University of the Health Sciences faculty
People from Dayton, Ohio
American people of Swiss descent
Year of birth missing (living people)
Living people
American women academics